(born August 10, 1983) is a Japanese former singer and songwriter who was active between 2000 to 2003. She achieved national recognition for singing the theme song to the Japanese anime series Case Closed, "Destiny".

Matsuhashi had a fairly brief career as an artist. She made indies debut in the summer of 2000, releasing first extended play Miki Matsuhashi. Her debut single, "Time Stands Still" was released in June 2001, and her debut studio album, Destiny, was released in less than a year later. In 2001, Matsuhashi released "Destiny", a cover of Ramjet Pulley as the second single from the album. The single became Matsuhashi's most successful single, reaching number 22 on the Oricon charts. The song was used as the opening theme song for the anime, Detective Conan, She had a few collaborations with other artists from Giza Studio label, including U-ka Saegusa. Matsuhashi has been on hiatus from the music scene since 2003. During her three-year career, Matsuhashi released one studio album, one extended plays and three singles.

Discography

Albums

Extended plays

Singles

Songwriting credits

References

External links
Official website from Being (in Japanese)

1983 births
Japanese women pop singers
Living people
Being Inc. artists
Musicians from Osaka
21st-century Japanese singers
21st-century Japanese women singers